Ernst of Schaumburg (September 24, 1569 – January 17, 1622) was the first Count of Schauenburg and Holstein-Pinneberg to earn the title of Prince in 1619.  However, he died in 1622 without an heir.  Schauenburg-Pinneberg had been a Lutheran region since his father Otto IV of Schaumburg had been won over to Martin Luther's teachings.  After Ernst's death, a Catholic Count, Jobst Hermann, received a portion of Schauenburg but he also died without children, and Otto V, who was a Calvinist, succeeded Ernst.

Prince Ernst built the Stadthagen Mausoleum for himself and his family. Today, this building is estimated as a cultural monument of European rank.

On 11 September 1597 he married Hedwig of Hesse-Kassel at Wilhelmsburg Castle in Schmalkalden. The marriage remained childless.

See also
House of Schaumburg
Otto IV of Schaumburg
Martin Luther
Protestant Reformation
Protestantism

External links
Catholic Encyclopedia article about the Counts of Schaumburg

|-

|-

1569 births
1622 deaths
Counts of Germany
House of Schauenburg
Counts of Holstein
German princes